{{Infobox actor
| name               = Mitra Gadhavi
| image              = 
| caption            = 
| birth_name         = 
| birth_date         = 
| birth_place        = Baroda, India
| alma_mater         = 
| occupation         = 
| years_active       = 2010–present
| works              = Chhello Divas, Anita (short film)
| height             = 5'10| spouse             = 
| children           = 
| awards             = 
| honours            = 
| website            = 
| signature          = 
}}
Mitra Gadhavi is an Indian actor, writer and lyricist from Gujarat. He is known for his roles in films such as Chhello Divas, Bas Ek Chance, and Shu Thayu?. His career as a theatre artist spanned more than a decade. His 2020 short film Anita became the first ever Gujarati movie to be screened at Venice Film Festival. His upcoming film 3 Ekka will release around Janmashtami 2023.

He had tested positive for COVID-19 in January 2022. During the pandemic, Mitra was applauded for using social media platforms to amplify SOS calls of patients across Delhi and Gujarat.

As a child, Mitra was keen to perform on stage. Later, he decided to pursue acting as a profession, and moved to Mumbai.

 Filmography 
Mitra also wrote & directed a play 'Listen – We Need To Talk'''.

References

External links 

 
 Mitra Gadhavi at Rotten Tomatoes

1990 births
Living people
21st-century Indian male actors
Male actors from Gujarat
Gujarati people
Male actors in Gujarati-language films
Male actors in Hindi cinema
Gadhavi (surname)
Gujarati theatre
Indian male stage actors